Doll by Doll were a British rock band based in London. The band was formed by Jackie Leven in 1977. They came to prominence during the new wave period but were largely ignored by the music press of the time - their emotional, psychedelic-tinged music was judged out of step with other bands of the time.

Career
The original line-up was Jackie Leven – vocals and guitar, Jo Shaw – vocals and guitar, Robin Spreafico – vocals and bass, and David Macintosh – vocals and percussion. This lineup only recorded one studio album Remember before Spreafico was replaced by Tony Waite (1958–2003). In this configuration they released the albums Gypsy Blood (produced by John Sinclair) and the eponymous third album, Doll By Doll, before the band split up.

At the time of final LP Grand Passion, only Leven was left of the original line-up, joined by Helen Turner (vocals and keyboards) and Tom Norden (vocals, guitar and bass) with a number of guest musicians, including David Gilmour of Pink Floyd. Mark Fletcher (bass) and Chris Clarke (drums) played with the group live. Doll By Doll finally fell apart in 1983, though Leven, Shaw and Macintosh plus ex-Sex Pistol Glen Matlock, released a single "Big Tears" under the name Concrete Bulletproof Invisible in 1988. Leven became a prolific solo artist, releasing a series of albums featuring more folk oriented material. 

In 2005 a live recording of the original band was released. Revenge of Memory, which features all but one of the songs on the Remember album, was recorded at the Sheffield Limits Club in 1977.

The four Doll by Doll studio albums were all released for the first time on CD in March 2007 on WEA/Rhino.

Discography
Remember (Automatic, 1979)
Gypsy Blood (Automatic, 1979)
Doll By Doll (Magnet, 1980)
Grand Passion (Magnet, 1982)
Revenge of Memory (Live at The Sheffield Limits Club 1977) (Haunted Valley, 2005)

References

British new wave musical groups
British rock music groups